Indorock is a musical genre that originated in the 1950s in the Netherlands. It is a fusion of Indonesian and Western music, with roots in Kroncong (traditional Portuguese-Indonesian fusion music). The genre was invented by Indo repatriates in the Netherlands after Indonesian independence on August 17, 1945, and became popular especially in Germany. Indorock is one of the earliest forms of "Eurorock". Its influence on Dutch popular music was immense.

History
The guitar was imported to the archipelago of the East Indies by Portuguese explorers in the 16th century. The traditional Portuguese song styles, saudade and fado, played with guitar accompaniment, later became kroncong music.

Many Indorock musicians had a predilection for Hawaiian music, which was popular in the Netherlands at the time. Other significant influences include American country & western, and the rock & roll repertoire played on radio stations in Indonesia via American (AFN) stations from the Philippines and Australia.

The Tielman Brothers (Reggy, Ponthon, Andy and Loulou Tielman) are generally seen as founders of Indorock, even though other Indorock bands existed before them. Being ethnically Indonesian and playing black American music to white audiences in the Netherlands and Germany, their music exemplifies the complex background of the style, which, according to George Lipsitz, is shaped by "the histories of Dutch and U.S. military combat in Asia and Europe" and by the "internalized racial histories of the United States, the Netherlands, and Germany". Since the Dutch music industry offered few venues for Indorock artists, many of them went to Germany where it quickly became highly popular, at least until the advent of British beat music.

Broader influence
Indo vocal and instrumental guitar music groups started to record American hits and became famous, starting a stream within Europe known as the Indo Rock scene.

Notable indorock artists
 Tielman Brothers (1957)
 Bintangs (1961)
 Blue Diamonds

References

Dutch styles of music
Indonesian styles of music
Fusion music genres